Vi bygger landet (We Build the Country) is a Norwegian film from 1936, directed by Olav Dalgard. The film is a so-called "workers' film" that was created on behalf of the Workers' Educational Association (AOF) to motivate voters in the cities to vote for the Labor Party in the parliamentary elections in 1936. Together with Norge for folket (1936) and By og land hand i hand (1937), it is part of the so-called workers' film trilogy.

Cast
 Georg Løkkeberg as Georg Larsen
 Rønnaug Alten as Tora Knudsen
 Oscar Egede-Nissen as Ole Larsen
 Fredrik Barth as Bredesen Jr.
 Jens Holstad as Larsen
 Tryggve Larssen as Svart-Pelle
 Toralf Sandø as Knudsen, a construction worker
 Eva Steen as Mrs. Larsen

References

External links
 
 Vi bygger landet at the National Library of Norway

1936 films
Norwegian black-and-white films
Films directed by Olav Dalgard